Foolish Heart may refer to:
"Foolish Heart" (song), a 1984 song by Steve Perry
 "Foolish Heart" (Grateful Dead song), 1989
Foolish Heart (film), a 1998 film
Foolish Heart (TV series), a 1999 Canadian TV series
 The Foolish Heart, a 1919 German silent film directed by Erik Lund
 "Foolish Heart", a 2017 song by Nikki Lane from the album Highway Queen

See also
 My Foolish Heart (disambiguation)